Hypogaea is a fungal genus in the family Agaricaceae. It is a monotypic genus, containing the single secotioid species Hypogaea brunnea, described as new to science in 1963 by mycologist Egon Horak.

See also
 List of Agaricaceae genera
 List of Agaricales genera

References

Agaricaceae
Monotypic Agaricales genera
Secotioid fungi